The Rally for Democracy and Liberty, abbreviated as R.D.L. (Rassemblement pour la Démocratie et la Liberté in French) is a Chadian rebel group that was formed in August 2005 by former members of the Military of Chad who deserted and united under their founder and current leader, Mohammed Nour.  Their main objective is to oust the government of the current Chadian president Idriss Déby and then hold elections after a two-year interim period. RDL has bases in eastern Chad and in the Darfur region of Sudan.  On December 18, 2005, the RDL attacked Chadian troops stationed in the city of Adre, causing the current crisis in the Chadian-Sudanese relations.

References 

Chadian Civil War (2005–2010)
Rebel groups in Chad